Masterton is a large town in the Greater Wellington Region of New Zealand that operates as the seat of the Masterton District (a territorial authority or local-government district).  It is the largest town in the Wairarapa, a region separated from Wellington by the Rimutaka ranges. It stands on the Waipoua stream between the Ruamahunga and Waingawa Rivers - 100 kilometres north-east of Wellington and 39.4 kilometres south of Eketahuna.

Masterton businesses include services for surrounding farmers. Three new industrial parks are being developed in Waingawa, Solway and Upper Plain. The town functions as the headquarters of the annual Golden Shears sheep-shearing competition.

Suburbs
Masterton suburbs include:
 Lansdowne, Te Ore Ore on the northern side
 Eastside and Homebush on the eastern side
 Upper Plain, Fernridge, Ngaumutawa, Akura and Masterton West on the western side
 Kuripuni and Solway on the southern side

History and culture

Early history

Masterton was founded in 1854 by the Small Farms Association. The association was led by Joseph Masters – after whom the town was named – and aimed to settle working people in villages and on the land. At first Masterton grew slowly, but as its farming hinterland became more productive it began to prosper.

In the 1870s it overtook Greytown as Wairarapa's major town. It became a borough in 1877 and was reached by the railway line from Wellington in 1880. The railway became for a time the main line from Wellington to the north of New Zealand and its arrival cemented the town's position as the Wairarapa region's main market and distribution centre.

Waipoua timber mill was producing butter boxes as early as 1884.

In April 1965 one of the country's worst industrial accidents occurred at the General Plastics Factory on 170 Dixon Street.

During World War II two battalions of the United States Marine Corps were stationed in Masterton.

Modern history

In essence providing support services for rural industry - living off the sheep's back - Masterton's real growth ended with that sector's retrenchment after the 1974 British entry to the trade and political grouping now the European Union. Efforts to decentralise industry to New Zealand's provinces gave Masterton a print works and some other industries but the lost economic activity was not restored.

From the 1970s, people and businesses left for opportunities elsewhere. In the 1980s, with government deregulation and protective tariffs lifted, more businesses closed and the town declined further.

It did not quite qualify to be a city by 1989 when the minimum population requirement for that status was lifted from 20,000 to 50,000.

Marae

Te Oreore marae and Ngā Tau e Waru meeting house, located in Masterton, is affiliated with the iwi of Ngāti Kahungunu and its hapū of Kahukuraawhitia, Kahukuranui, Ngāti Te Hina, Tahu o Kahungunu, Tamahau and Whiunga, and with the iwi of Rangitāne, and its hapū of Hinetearorangi, Ngāi Tamahau, Ngāti Hāmua, Ngāti Taimahu, Ngāti Tangatakau, Ngāti Te Noti, Ngāti Te Raetea and Ngāti Te Whātui.

In October 2020, the Government committed $2,179,654 from the Provincial Growth Fund to upgrade Ngāi Tumapuhia a Rangi ki Okautete, Motuwairaka, Pāpāwai, Kohunui, Hurunui o Rangi and Te Oreore marae. The projects were expected to create 19.8 full time jobs.

Another local marae, Akura Marae, is affiliated with the Ngāti Kahungunu hapū of Ngāti Te Ahuahu and Ngāti Te Hina. and with the Rangitāne hapū of Ngāti Mātangiuru and Ngāti Te Hina.

Demographics

Masterton District had a population of 25,557 at the 2018 New Zealand census, an increase of 2,205 people (9.4%) since the 2013 census, and an increase of 2,934 people (13.0%) since the 2006 census. There were 9,936 households. There were 12,372 males and 13,185 females, giving a sex ratio of 0.94 males per female. The median age was 43.2 years (compared with 37.4 years nationally), with 4,968 people (19.4%) aged under 15 years, 4,371 (17.1%) aged 15 to 29, 10,857 (42.5%) aged 30 to 64, and 5,361 (21.0%) aged 65 or older.

Ethnicities were 84.7% European/Pākehā, 21.3% Māori, 4.0% Pacific peoples, 3.9% Asian, and 1.6% other ethnicities. People may identify with more than one ethnicity.

The percentage of people born overseas was 12.9, compared with 27.1% nationally.

Although some people objected to giving their religion, 50.2% had no religion, 37.7% were Christian, 0.7% were Hindu, 0.1% were Muslim, 0.4% were Buddhist and 3.1% had other religions.

Of those at least 15 years old, 3,030 (14.7%) people had a bachelor or higher degree, and 4,803 (23.3%) people had no formal qualifications. The median income was $27,800, compared with $31,800 nationally. 2,403 people (11.7%) earned over $70,000 compared to 17.2% nationally. The employment status of those at least 15 was that 9,420 (45.8%) people were employed full-time, 3,270 (15.9%) were part-time, and 705 (3.4%) were unemployed.

Climate
Masterton enjoys a mild temperate climate grading towards a Mediterranean climate. Due to the geography of the Wairarapa valley and the Tararua Range directly to the west, the town's temperature fluctuates more than the nearby inland city of Palmerston North. Masterton experiences warmer, dry summers with highs above 30 °C possible and colder winters with frequent frost and lows below 0 °C.

Government

Between 1877 and 1989, Masterton Borough Council administered the area. An early mayor was the storekeeper Myer Caselberg (1886–1888).

The Masterton District Council (MDC) is the Masterton District territorial authority. It is made up of an elected mayor, a deputy mayor/councillor, and nine additional councillors. They are elected under the First Past the Post system in triennial elections, with the last election being held on Saturday 12 October 2019.

The current council members are: Lyn Patterson (M), Graham McClymont (DM), Gary Caffell, Brent Gare, David Holmes, Bex Johnson, Frazer Mailman, Tim Nelson, Tina Nixon, Chris Petersen and Sandy Ryan. All councillors are elected 'At Large'. There are also two Iwi representatives, Ra Smith and Tirau Te Tau.

Nationally, Masterton is part of the  general electorate and the  Māori electorate.

Politics 2013 to 2016
Applications for local government reorganisation from the Greater Wellington Regional Council and the Wairarapa district councils in mid-2013 led to a proposal from the Local Government Commission for a region-wide unitary authority. In June 2015, the Commission decided not to proceed with this proposal due to lack of public support. Instead, because about 40 per cent of submissions suggested alternatives to the status quo, the Commission decided work with councils and the community to achieve some consensus on the challenges it faced, and to collaborate in identifying possible options to address the challenges.

Education

Masterton's schools were reviewed over 2003 to take into account a changing demographic of the population, with several primary schools closing and merging. Today, there are five state primary schools in the township – four state contributing primaries: Douglas Park, Fernridge, Masterton Primary and Solway; and one state full primary: Lakeview. In addition, there are five state full primary schools in the surrounding district: Mauriceville, Opaki, Tinui, Wainuiouru and Whareama, and two state-integrated primaries: St Patrick's, a Catholic contributing primary, and Hadlow, an Anglican full primary.

Masterton Intermediate School, with over 500 students, is the only intermediate school in Masterton (and the Wairarapa), bridging the gap between the state contributing primary schools and the secondary schools.

Two state secondary schools serve Masterton: Wairarapa College is the largest of the two with 1050 students, serving the western side of the town, while Makoura College with 320 students serves the eastern side of town. Four state-integrated schools also serve the town: Chanel College is a coeducational Catholic school with its own intermediate department; Rathkeale College and St Matthew's Collegiate are Anglican boys and girls schools respectively, with St Matthew's having an intermediate department; and Solway College is a Presbyterian girls school with intermediate. There is also a composite (primary/secondary combined) Māori immersion school in the town: Te Kura Kaupapa Maori o Wairarapa.

Masterton has its own polytechnic, run by UCOL (Universal College of Learning).

The Masterton District Library and Archive, situated on Queen Street, are part of the Lower North Island SMART Libraries group, which involves sharing books and information between 22 libraries.

Media

Newspapers

There are several newspapers circulated in Masterton, including two daily publications (Wairarapa Times-Age, The Dominion-Post) and a free community title, Wairarapa Midweek.
The Wairarapa Times-Age is the only daily newspaper based in Masterton. Formed by a merger between the Wairarapa Age and the Wairarapa Daily Times on 1 April 1938, The Wairarapa Times-Age has an audited paid circulation of 5,427. The Wairarapa Times-Age is owned by Andrew Denholm of National Media Limited. NZME Publishing Limited sold the business, which includes the Wairarapa Midweek and TA Property papers in June 2016. Andrew Denholm was the previous general manager. Seamus Boyer is current editor.
The Wairarapa Midweek, a weekly community paper with an audited circulation of 21,186, is distributed every Wednesday along with the TA Property.
The Wairarapa Times Age building at 70 Chapel Street no longer holds the presses, and the space was used by the nascent Masterton Fab lab which has now relocated to UCOL.

Fairfax NZ owned The Dominion Post is widely circulated in the Masterton district. The Wellington-based metropolitan daily newspaper has an office, Media House, at 123 Chapel Street in Masterton. The Dominion-Post has an audited paid circulation of 55,496.

Radio
Masterton is serviced by one local radio station. Wairarapa's MORE FM 89.5 or 105.9 for the coastal frequency. MORE FM broadcasts locally from 6am to 10am daily from studios in Kuripuni. The station was founded by controversial Broadcaster Paul Henry, as TODAY FM 89.3 in Carterton in 1991. Later the station was rebranded as Hitz 89FM, Wairarapa's Best Music. The MORE FM Breakfast Show has been hosted by well-known local broadcaster Brent Gare, since 2004. The Saturday sports show at 8am has been hosted by local sports-caster Chris "Coggie" Cogdale since 1992.

Television
Television coverage reached Masterton in 1963, after the Otahoua transmitter east of the town was commissioned to relay Wellington's WNTV1 channel (now part of TVNZ 1). The town was early receiving television since the Otahoua transmitter was required to repeat the signal from the Mount Victoria (and later Mount Kaukau) transmitter in Wellington to the Wharite Peak transmitter near Palmerston North (also commissioned in 1963). Digital terrestrial television (Freeview HD) was introduced to the Masterton area in July 2011, in preparedness for the area's digital switchover in September 2013. The service broadcasts from the Popoiti transmitter, south of the township.

Utilities

Water
Masterton's water is piped from the Waingawa through a Masterton District Council treatment plant on the river about 10 kilometres west of the town. The water is clarified and filtered then chlorinated and fluoridated. Lime is added to neutralise the pH to protect the pipes. There is a fluoride-free drinking water tap in Manuka Reserve in Manuka Street.

Typhoid epidemics broke out each year in Masterton and in 1896 Parliament approved a Borough Council loan to build a drainage and water supply system. Work on the water supply did not begin until 1899 delayed by disagreements over the appropriate sources for water. It was finished at the end of 1900 when at the formal opening ceremony there was enough pressure to send a jet right over the Post Office tower to the accompaniment of the Masterton Municipal Brass Band. The mayor, Mr Pownall, said he was now ready to pour cold water on the scheme's opponents. A covered reservoir and treatment plant at Fernridge was supplied by an intake from springs beside the Waingawa four miles further up river. The main was duplicated in 1915. It was replaced by the current system completed in 1983.

The sewage system was completed in 1901. It drained through settlement ponds and filter beds to the Ruamahanga south of the town. The sewage farm's system included a newfangled "septic tank" which was subject to failures.

Energy
The Wairarapa Electric Power Board was established in Carterton in 1920 to supply the Wairarapa with electricity from the Kourarau hydro power station at Gladstone, southeast of both towns. Masterton was connected to Mangahao on 17 May 1925 when the transmission line from Bunnythorpe to Masterton (via Woodville and Mangamaire) and the Masterton substation were commissioned. The Wairarapa Electric Power Board moved to headquarters in Masterton in the 1950s. The power board, then named Wairarapa Electricity, dissolved following the 1998 electricity sector reforms. The retail business was sold to Genesis Energy and the distribution lines business sold to Powerco. Today Powerco continues to operate the local distribution network in the town and surrounding district with electricity fed from Transpower's national grid at its Masterton substation in Waingawa.

Masterton Gas Company was established by the Borough Council in 1886 by the corner of Bannister and Kirton Streets. About 20 years later it was moved to the end of Bentley Street just south of the railway station. The large quantities of coal were brought in by rail. By 1945 it had become clear consumers preferred electricity and the gasworks closed in the 1950s.

There is no natural gas network in Masterton, making it the largest North Island urban area without one. There has been no more than a proposal to connect Masterton to the North Island natural gas network via a branch off the Palmerston North to Hastings high-pressure pipeline commissioned in 1983.

Telephone
The Masterton magneto telephone exchange opened on 31 January 1897, with 53 subscribers. On 31 May 1919, Masterton became the first town in New Zealand to have a fully automatic (Western Electric 7A Rotary) telephone exchange.

Masterton and nearby Carterton were the first towns in New Zealand to introduce the emergency number 111, in September 1958.

Before the 1991 to 1993 changes, the area code for Masterton was 059. Today the area code is 06, and numbers generally begin with 370, 372 (rural areas), 377, 378 and 946. Numbers beginning 946 are businesses.

Internet
On 3 December 2015 the UFB rollout to the town was completed.

Transport

Masterton is very well served by public transport with rail and bus links. Despite Masterton and the Wairarapa valley being reasonably close to Wellington, they are separated by the Rimutaka Ranges with State Highway 2 cutting a winding hill road through the range, and the Rimutaka railway tunnel. The Wairarapa Line railway allows access to Wellington, Lower Hutt and Upper Hutt.

Unlike other parts of the country, the Wairarapa has seen passenger rail services remain, largely due to its proximity to Wellington and the Rimutaka Tunnel's advantage over the Rimutaka Hill road. There has been talk of constructing a road tunnel through the ranges for decades, but this has been ruled out due to the extremely high cost. According to the latest transportation plan from the Greater Wellington Regional Council, the only work planned is for upgrades to the Rimutaka Hill road and the addition of passing lanes between Featherston and Masterton.

Rail
Masterton is linked to Wellington and the Hutt Valley by the Wairarapa Connection, a Tranz Metro passenger service run for Greater Wellington Region's Metlink, primarily operating at peak times serving commuters from Masterton and the Wairarapa with five return services on Monday to Thursday, six on Friday and two at weekends and public holidays. There are three railway stations in the town; Masterton, Renall Street and Solway. Four stations north of Masterton used to operate at Opaki, Kopuranga, Mauriceville and Mangamahoe. Services to these stations ceased between 1969 and 1988. To cope with an increase in logging in the Wairarapa, an additional 2.5 hectare rail freight hub has been operational in Norfolk Road, Waingawa since March 2016.

Bus

There is a local Metlink bus service in Masterton operated by Tranzit. The buses operate on five routes: three suburban and two regional including:

There is also the MPN: Masterton to Palmerston North (via Woodville) service, not operated under the Metlink brand.

Air
Hood Aerodrome is 2 miles southwest of the town of Masterton. As of 2015, there are no commercial flights from Hood Aerodrome. From early 2009 until late 2013, Air New Zealand provided flights to Auckland, operated by subsidiary Eagle Airways six days a week, mainly to serve business customers in the Wairarapa. There have been a few other unsuccessful attempts at commercial air travel in Masterton, mostly failing due to its proximity to major airports in Wellington and Palmerston North. The most significant was by South Pacific Airlines of New Zealand (SPANZ), which operated daily flights using DC3s during the sixties to destinations nationwide until the airline's closure in 1966.

Queen Elizabeth Park 

Queen Elizabeth Park covers more than 20 hectares (50 acres) near the heart of Masterton on land set aside for the purpose in 1854. Its most notable aspects are the Giant Sequoia (Sequoiadendron giganteum) trees planted in 1875, its other mature trees, and sheltered oval cricket ground. Queen Elizabeth came to Masterton Park in 1954 to be noisily welcomed by the mayor and the citizens and every schoolchild of the Wairarapa. After that she rested at the Empire hotel, waved to the crowd from the balcony and graciously gave her own name for the park.

Miniature railway 

The park contains a miniature railway, built by the Jaycees and opened in 1972 by Norman Kirk. It has a single station, Waipoua, and is upkept by a group of volunteers. A ride on the train costs $1, a fare that has been unchanged since 1984. The line has a steam locomotive, restored in 2021, which formerly operated at Gisborne and at Caroline Bay, Timaru, where a steam locomotive was operating in 1942. The locomotive's origin is unknown, though it is similar to many Atlantic steam engines built by Bassett-Lowke from 1911.

Museum 
Aratoi Wairarapa Museum of Art and History opened in Masterton in 1969. A sculpture by Barbara Hepworth was the first item in the museum's collection. It now contains almost 4,000 items.

Sports
In rugby union, Heartland Championship team Wairarapa Bush is based in Masterton, playing their home games at Memorial Park.

In association football, Central Premier League side Wairarapa United play some of their home games at Masterton; also playing in Carterton.

In cricket, the Hawke Cup team Wairarapa have their headquarters in Masterton. Their home ground is Queen Elizabeth Park.

Notable people 

 Sylvia Ashton-Warner
 Mary Gertrude Banahan
 Barry Barclay
 Harold Barrowclough, Chief Justice of New Zealand
 Amanda Billing
 Roger Blackley, art historian
 Constance Bolton, artist
 Michael Bracewell, international cricketer
 Russell Calvert, politician
 Ted Chamberlain, plant pathologist
 Jemaine Clement, actor, comedian and musician
 Wyatt Creech, politician
 Helen Cowie, Doctor
 Ian Cross, novelist
 Barry Dallas, medical practitioner and politician
 George Davis-Goff, naval officer
 Haddon Donald, soldier, businessman and politician 
 Pat Evison
 John Falloon
 Bill Francis
 George Groombridge
 Christopher Hodson
 Alexander Hogg, newspaper editor and politician
 Thomas W. Horton, RAF officer
 Raybon Kan, writer and stand-up comedian
 Ladyhawke, singer-songwriter
 Jack Lewin, prominent public servant
 Sir Brian Lochore, All Black
 Alan MacDiarmid, Nobel Prize winning chemist
 Ron Mark, soldier and politician
 Harold Miller, librarian
 David Nicholson, Australian politician
 Susan Parkinson, nutritionist
 Edwin Perry, politician
 George Petersen, historian
 Arthur Prior, logician and philosopher
 Ian Prior, doctor and epidemiologist
 Frances Rutherford, artist
 Brad Shields. Rugby player
 Campbell Smith, playwright
 Harold Smith, politician
 J. Valentine Smith, landowner
 Olive Rose Sutherland, teacher
 Ivan Sutherland, ethnologist
 Selina Sutherland, nurse, founder of Masterton Hospital
 Bill Tolhurst, politician
 Elwyn Welch, farmer, ornithologist, conservationist and missionary
 Aaron Slight, World Superbike motorcycle racer

Sister cities
Masterton has sister-city relationships with:
  Hatsukaichi, Hiroshima, Japan
  Changchun, China
  Armidale, New South Wales, Australia

See also
 Masterton railway station
 Renall Street railway station
 Solway railway station

Notes

References

External links

 Masterton District Council
 Masterton Tourist Information

 
Masterton District
Populated places in the Wellington Region